Laxmi Raman Acharya (1914-1997) was the Finance Minister of the Indian state of Uttar Pradesh.

References

https://web.archive.org/web/20090522012055/http://uplegisassembly.gov.in/BUDGET%20SPEECH.HTM

External links
 Ministers in Uttar Pradesh Government
 http://www.oudhbarassociation.com/pages/prom_past.htm

1914 births
1997 deaths
People from Agra
20th-century Indian educational theorists
Indian independence activists from Uttar Pradesh
20th-century Indian lawyers
Indian National Congress politicians from Uttar Pradesh
People from Alwar
Uttar Pradesh MLAs 1952–1957
State cabinet ministers of Uttar Pradesh
Ambassadors of India to Mexico